Doug Berry may refer to:

Doug Berry (Canadian football) (born 1948), American football coach
Doug Berry (ice hockey) (born 1957), Canadian hockey player
Doug Berry (politician) (1907–1957), Australian politician
 Douglas berry (Rubus ursinus), type of dewberry identified by David Douglas